The Auburn Tigers football program represents Auburn University in the sport of American college football. Auburn competes in the Football Bowl Subdivision (FBS) of the National Collegiate Athletic Association (NCAA) and the Western Division of the Southeastern Conference (SEC).

Auburn officially began competing in intercollegiate football in 1892. The Tigers joined the Southeastern Conference in 1932 as one of the inaugural members of the conference and the Tigers began competing in the West Division when the conference divided in 1992. Auburn has achieved 12 undefeated seasons, won 16 conference championships, along with 10 divisional championships. The Tigers have made 44 post season bowl appearances, including 12 historically major bowl berths. With over 780 total wins, Auburn is the 13th winningest FBS program.

The Tigers have produced three Heisman Trophy winners: quarterback Pat Sullivan in 1971, running back Bo Jackson in 1985, and quarterback Cam Newton in 2010. Auburn has also produced 31 consensus All-American players. The College Football Hall of Fame has inducted a total of 12 individuals from Auburn, including eight student-athletes and four head coaches: John Heisman, Mike Donahue, Ralph Jordan, and Pat Dye. Jordan, who coached from 1951 to 1975, led Auburn to its first national championship and won a total of 176 games, the most by any Auburn coach.

Auburn's home stadium is Jordan–Hare Stadium, which opened in 1939 and becomes Alabama's fifth largest city on gamedays with a capacity of 87,451. Auburn's arch rival is in-state foe Alabama. The Tigers and Crimson Tide meet annually in the Iron Bowl, one of the biggest rivalries in all of sports.

History

Auburn claims two national championships, 1957 and 2010, but has been recognized with three additional national championships from NCAA documented selectors: 1913, 1983, and 1993. Three Auburn players, Pat Sullivan in 1971, Bo Jackson in 1985, and Cam Newton in 2010 have won the Heisman Trophy. The Trophy's namesake, John Heisman, coached at Auburn from 1895 until 1899. Auburn is the only school that Heisman coached at (among others, Georgia Tech and Clemson) that has produced a Heisman Trophy winner. Auburn's Jordan–Hare Stadium has a capacity of 87,451 ranking as the tenth-largest on-campus stadium in the NCAA as of January 2011. Auburn played the first football game in the Deep South in 1892 against the University of Georgia at Piedmont Park in Atlanta, Georgia. The Tigers' first bowl appearance was in 1937 in the sixth Bacardi Bowl played in Havana, Cuba. AU Football has won 12 conference championships (8 SEC), has had seven perfect seasons, and since the division of the conference in 1992, six outright western division championships (1997, 2000, 2004, 2010, 2013, 2017) along with three additional co-championships. Auburn plays archrival Alabama each year in a game known as the Iron Bowl. In the overall series with Alabama, Auburn trails Alabama 42–35–1, despite holding an 18–14 advantage in games played since 1982. Of the 14 SEC member universities, Auburn currently ranks 5th in the number of SEC football championships, and has won the most SEC titles of any program in the last decade.

Auburn completed the 2004 football season with an unblemished 13–0 record winning the SEC championship, their first conference title since 1989 and their first outright title since 1987. However, this achievement was somewhat overshadowed by the Tigers being left out of the BCS championship game in deference to two other undefeated, higher ranked teams, USC and Oklahoma. The 2004 team was led by quarterback Jason Campbell (Washington Redskins), running backs Carnell Williams (Tampa Bay Buccaneers) and Ronnie Brown (Miami Dolphins), and cornerback Carlos Rogers (Washington Redskins).

Auburn completed the 2010 football season with a perfect record of 13–0 winning the SEC championship when they defeated the University of South Carolina 56–17, which set an SEC Championship Game record for most points scored and largest margin of victory. The Tigers went on to defeat the Oregon Ducks 22–19 in their first appearance in the BCS National Championship Game on January 10, 2011, in Glendale, Arizona. The 2010 team was led by quarterback Cam Newton, who became the Heisman trophy winner of 2010 along with multiple other awards.

Auburn completed the 2013 regular season with an 11–1 record by knocking off then #1 Alabama. Auburn went on to defeat #5 Missouri 59–42 in the 2013 SEC Championship Game to claim its eighth SEC championship. Auburn faced #1 Florida State in the 2014 BCS National Championship Game at the Rose Bowl, falling to the Seminoles in the final seconds, 31–34. The Tigers finished the season with a 12–2 record and ranked #2 in the final AP and Coaches polls.

Program success
In terms of winning percentage, Auburn ranks as the 15th most successful team of all time (1869-2019) with a 63.052% win rate.

The College Football Research Center lists Auburn as the 14th best college football program in history, with eight Auburn squads listed in Billingsley's Top 200 Teams of All Time (1869–2010). The Bleacher Report placed Auburn as the 18th best program of all time in their power rankings conducted after the 2010 season. In 2013, College Football Data Warehouse, a website dedicated to the historical data of college football, listed Auburn 13th all-time. After the 2008 season, ESPN ranked Auburn the 21st most prestigious program in history. Additional noteworthy outlets to rank Auburn in the top 25 all time were College Football News, who put the Tigers at 13th all time after the 2018 season, and the Associated Press, who ranked Auburn 15th all time after the 2017 season.

The Associated Press poll statistics show Auburn with the 11th best national record of being ranked in the final AP Poll and 14th overall (ranked 503 times out of 1058 polls since the poll began in 1936), with an average ranking of 11.2. Since the Coaches Poll first released a final poll in 1950, Auburn has 26 seasons where the team finished ranked in the top 20 in both the AP and Coaches Polls.

Auburn has also had success against teams ranked number one in the nation. The Tigers have beaten seven teams ranked number one in either the AP, Coaches, Bowl Championship Series (BCS), or College Football Playoff (CFP) rankings. The BCS was created in 1998 to guarantee bowl game matchups between the top teams, including a national championship game between the two top-ranked teams. The BCS was discontinued in 2014 and replaced by the CFP, which organizes a four-team playoff and national championship game.

Conference affiliations
Auburn has been both independent and affiliated with three conferences.
 Independent (1892–1894)
 Southern Intercollegiate Athletic Association (1895–1920) 
 Southern Conference (1921–1932)
 Southeastern Conference (1933–present)

Championships

National championships
Five Auburn teams have been awarded a national championship from NCAA-designated major selectors—1913, 1957, 1983, 1993, and 2010. The 1957 and 2010 championships are consensus national championships and claimed by the university.

1913 season

The 1913 team was coached by Mike Donahue and was undefeated at 8–0, outscoring opponents 224–13. Auburn, led by senior captain Kirk Newell, finished as SIAA champions for the first time in school history. Newell, also a member of the Upsilon Chapter of Pi Kappa Alpha, went on to be a World War I hero and member of the Alabama Sports Hall of Fame. The Tigers were awarded a national title by the Billingsley Report under their Billingsley MOV (margin of victory) formula, one of two formulas used by Billingsley.

1957 season

The 1957 Auburn Tigers, led by coach Ralph "Shug" Jordan, finished with a perfect 10–0 record, marking the school's first ever SEC championship. Auburn was recognized as national champions by the AP Poll even though they were on probation and did not participate in a bowl game. This was the school's first recognized national championship. The 1957 title is shared with Ohio State, who was named the national champion by the Coaches' Poll. This was the first of only two times in the history of the AP championship that it was awarded to a team on probation not allowed to participate in a bowl game (it would occur again in 1974 with Oklahoma).

1983 season

The 1983 Auburn Tigers, led by head coach Pat Dye and running back Bo Jackson, finished 11–1 after playing the nation's toughest schedule. Their only loss came against No.3 Texas, who defeated the Tigers, 20–7. Auburn went on to defeat No.8 Michigan, 9–7, in the Sugar Bowl. Despite entering the bowl games ranked third in both major polls, and with both teams ranked higher losing their bowl games, the Tigers ended ranked third in the final AP poll. The New York Times ranked Auburn number one at the conclusion of the season, but several other retroactive polling found Auburn at number one, including the Billingsley Report. The universally recognized national champions for 1983 are the Miami Hurricanes.

1993 season

Head coach Terry Bowden led the 1993 team to a perfect season in his first year on the Plains. The Tigers were the only undefeated team in major college football; however, they were banned from playing on television or post-season games due to NCAA violations. Rival Alabama was sent to the SEC Championship Game as the substitute representative of the Western Division. Auburn finished ranked fourth in the nation by the Associated Press. However, Auburn was on NCAA probation in 1993 and ineligible for post season play.

2010 season

The Tigers, led by second year head coach Gene Chizik, completed a 12–0 regular season record and defeated South Carolina in the 2010 SEC Championship Game. On October 24, 2010, Auburn was ranked first in the BCS polls for the first time in school history. On January 10, 2011, Auburn defeated Oregon in the BCS National Championship Game in Glendale, Arizona, 22–19. It was the school's second claimed national title, but their first undisputed title. Their quarterback, Cam Newton, became the Tigers' third Heisman Trophy winner. He had a total of 2,854 yards passing and 30 passing touchdowns. He also rushed for 1,473 yards and 20 touchdowns. Auburn went on to have two first round picks in the 2011 NFL draft with Cam Newton going number one and Nick Fairley going 13th.

Conference championships
Auburn officially has won 16 total conference championships, including seven SIAA Championships, one Southern Conference Championship, and eight SEC Championships.

† Co-champions

Division championships
Since divisional play began in 1992, Auburn has won the SEC Western Division championship and gone on to the conference title game on six occasions and is 3–3 in the SEC Championship Game. The most recent appearance came in 2017 as Auburn completed the regular season 10–2, losing a rematch to Georgia in the 2017 SEC Championship Game. Auburn has also shared the western division title, but did not play in the championship game due to tiebreakers on three occasions. Auburn also finished the 1993 season in first place in the division but was not eligible for postseason play.

† Co-champions

Head coaches

Auburn has had 28 head coaches, and three interim head coaches, since it began play during the 1892 season. On November 29, 2022, Hugh Freeze was named head coach of the Tigers. The team has played more than 1,200 games over 120 seasons. In that time, eight coaches have led the Tigers in postseason bowl games: Jack Meagher, Ralph Jordan, Pat Dye, Terry Bowden, Tommy Tuberville, Gene Chizik, Gus Malzahn, and Bryan Harsin. Billy Watkins, Mike Donahue, Chet A. Wynne, Jordan, Dye, Tuberville, Chizik, and Malzahn won a combined 12 conference championships. During their tenures, Jordan and Chizik each won national championships with the Tigers.

Bowl games
Auburn has participated in 45 bowls in total, with the Tigers garnering a record of 24–19–2.

Rivalries

Historically, Auburn has two main rivals, the cross-state Alabama Crimson Tide in the Iron Bowl, and the bordering Georgia Bulldogs in the Deep South's Oldest Rivalry.

Alabama

Alabama leads the series 48–37–1 through the 2021 season.

Clemson

Auburn leads 34–15–2 through the 2018 season.

Florida

Auburn leads 43–39–2 through the 2019 season.

Georgia

Georgia leads 62–56–8 through the 2021 season.

Georgia Tech

Auburn leads the series 47–41–4 through the 2017 season.

LSU

LSU leads 32–24–1 through the 2022 season.

Ole Miss

Auburn leads the series 35–11 through the 2022 season.

Tennessee

Auburn leads 29–22–3 through the 2020 season.

Tulane

Tulane leads the series 17–15–6 through the 2019 season.

Traditions

Tiger Walk
Before each Auburn home football game, thousands of Auburn fans line Donahue Drive to cheer on the team as they walk from the Auburn Athletic Complex to Jordan–Hare Stadium. The tradition began in the 1950s when groups of kids would walk up the street to greet the team and get autographs. During the tenure of coach Doug Barfield, the coach urged fans to come out and support the team, and thousands did. Today the team walks down the hill and into the stadium surrounded by fans who pat them on the back and shake their hands as they walk. The largest Tiger Walk occurred on December 2, 1989, before the first ever home football game against rival Alabama—the Iron Bowl. On that day, an estimated 20,000 fans packed the one block section of road leading to the stadium. According to former athletic director David Housel, Tiger Walk has become "the most copied tradition in all of college football".

"War Eagle"

There are many stories surrounding the origins of Auburn's battle cry, "War Eagle". The most popular account involves the first Auburn football game in 1892 between Auburn and the University of Georgia. According to the story, in the stands that day was an old Civil War soldier with an eagle he had found injured on a battlefield and kept as a pet. The eagle broke free and began to soar over the field, and Auburn began to march toward the Georgia end-zone. The crowd began to chant, "War Eagle" as the eagle soared. After Auburn won the game, the eagle crashed to the field and died but, according to the legend, his spirit lives on every time an Auburn man or woman yells "War Eagle!" The battle cry of "War Eagle" also functions as a greeting for those associated with the university. For many years, a live golden eagle has embodied the spirit of this tradition. The eagle was once housed on campus in The A. Elwyn Hamer Jr. Aviary (which was the second largest single-bird enclosure in the country), but the aviary was taken down in 2003 and the eagle moved to a nearby raptor center. The eagle, War Eagle VI (nicknamed "Tiger"), was trained in 2000 to fly free around the stadium before every home game to the delight of fans. The present eagle, War Eagle VIII (nicknamed "Aurea"), continues the tradition. War Eagle VI is believed to be the inspiration behind the 2005–2006 Auburn Cheerleading squad's chant, "Tigers, Tigers, Gooooooo Tigers!"

Toomer's Corner
The intersection of Magnolia Avenue and College Street in Auburn, which marks the transition from downtown Auburn to the university campus, is known as Toomer's Corner. It is named after Toomer's Drugs, a small store on the corner that has been an Auburn landmark since 1896. Hanging over the corner were two massive old oak trees, planted in 1937, and whenever there was cause for celebration in the Auburn community, toilet paper could usually be found hanging from the trees. Also known as "rolling the corner", this tradition originated after Auburn upset No.2 Alabama in the 1972 Iron Bowl, The famous 'Punt Bama Punt' Game. "We beat the 'number 2' out of Alabama." Until the mid-1990s, the tradition was relegated to only celebrating athletic wins.

The oak trees were cut down by the university in April 2013, as a result of their being poisoned by Harvey Updyke Jr., a fan of rival Alabama.

Wreck Tech Pajama Parade
The Wreck Tech Pajama Parade originated in 1896, when a group of mischievous Auburn students, determined to show up the more well-known engineers from Georgia Tech, snuck out of their dorms the night before the football game between Auburn and Tech and greased the railroad tracks. According to the story, the train carrying the Tech team slid through town and didn't stop until it was halfway to the neighboring town of Loachapoka, Alabama. The Tech team was forced to walk the five miles back to Auburn and, not surprisingly, were rather weary at the end of their journey. This likely contributed to their 45–0 loss. While the railroad long ago ceased to be the way teams traveled to Auburn and students never greased the tracks again, the tradition continues in the form of a parade through downtown Auburn. Students parade through the streets in their pajamas and organizations build floats.

Award winners
A number of Auburn players and coaches have won national awards, including 66 players being named as college football All-Americans. The Tigers also have 11 coaches and players who have been inducted into the College Football Hall of Fame in Atlanta.

Statues

Retired numbers

The Tigers have retired three numbers to date, honoring the following players:

Hall of Fame

National awards
Players

Coaches

1st Team All-Americans

† Consensus All-American
‡ Unanimous All-American

Future non-conference opponents 
Announced schedules as of April 26, 2020.

References

External links
 

 
American football teams established in 1892
1892 establishments in Alabama